Blaby was a county constituency represented in the House of Commons of the Parliament of the United Kingdom, which existed from 1974 until 2010. It elected one Member of Parliament (MP) by the first past the post system of election.  It was a safe seat for the Conservative Party, being held by Conservative MPs throughout its existence.

History
Blaby constituency was created in 1974 from parts of the Harborough seat. It is named after the village of Blaby in south west Leicestershire. A safe Conservative seat consisting mostly of middle-class commuter towns and villages for the neighbouring city of Leicester, it was held for many years by the former Chancellor of the Exchequer Nigel Lawson.  Lawson was succeeded in 1992 by Andrew Robathan, who held the seat until its abolition.

Following its review of parliamentary representation in Leicestershire, the Boundary Commission for England renamed the Blaby constituency as South Leicestershire, with minor alterations to its boundaries, in time for the 2010 election.

Boundaries
1974–1983: The Rural Districts of Blaby and Lutterworth.

1983–1997: The District of Blaby, and the District of Harborough wards of Broughton, Dunton, Gilmorton, Kilworth, Lutterworth Linden, Lutterworth St Mary's, Lutterworth Sherrier, Lutterworth Wycliffe, Peatling, and Ullesthorpe.

1997–2010: The District of Blaby wards of Cosby, Countesthorpe, Croft Hill, Enderby, Flamville, Fosse, Glen Parva, Millfield, Narborough, Normanton, Northfield, Ravenhurst, St John's, Stanton, Whetstone, Winchester, and Winstanley, and the District of Harborough wards of Broughton, Dunton, Gilmorton, Kilworth, Lutterworth Linden, Lutterworth St Mary's, Lutterworth Sherrier, Lutterworth Wycliffe, Peatling, and Ullesthorpe.

Members of Parliament

Elections

Elections in the 1970s

Elections in the 1980s

Elections in the 1990s

Elections in the 2000s

From the general election of 2010, Blaby has been re-shaped and renamed South Leicestershire.

See also
List of parliamentary constituencies in Leicestershire and Rutland

Notes and references

Sources

Guardian Unlimited Politics | Ask Aristotle | Blaby - Election History  - Elections (1992–1997)
UK General Elections since 1832  - Elections (1974–1992)

Constituencies of the Parliament of the United Kingdom established in 1974
Constituencies of the Parliament of the United Kingdom disestablished in 2010
Parliamentary constituencies in Leicestershire (historic)